The 1948–49 Anderson Duffey Packers season was the Packers' third year in the United States' National Basketball League (NBL), which was also the twelfth and final year the league existed. Ten teams competed in the NBL in 1948–49, comprising five teams in both the Eastern and Western Divisions.

The Anderson Duffey Packers played their home games at Anderson High School Wigwam. The Packers finished in first place in the Eastern Division. In the first series of the NBL playoffs, Anderson received an automatic bye. In the Eastern semifinals (the Packers' first round) they defeated the Syracuse Nationals three games to one (3–1). They then went on to win their first league championship 3–0 over Western Division champion Oshkosh All-Stars.

Players Frank Brian (First Team), Bill Closs (Second), and Boag Johnson (Second) earned All-NBL honors.

Roster

Note: Jack Walton was not on the playoffs roster.

Regular season

Season standings

Playoffs

Opening round
Received opening round bye.

Semifinals
(1E) Anderson Duffey Packers vs. (2E) Syracuse Nationals: Anderson wins series 3–1
Game 1 @ Syracuse: Anderson 89, Syracuse 74
Game 2 @ Syracuse: Syracuse 80, Anderson 62
Game 3 @ Anderson: Anderson 76, Syracuse 59
Game 4 @ Anderson: Anderson 90, Syracuse 84

NBL Championship
(1E) Anderson Duffey Packers vs. (1W) Oshkosh All-Stars: Anderson wins series 3–0
Game 1 @ Oshkosh: Anderson 74, Oshkosh 70
Game 2 @ Oshkosh: Anderson 72, Oshkosh 70
Game 3 @ Anderson: Anderson 88, Oshkosh 64

Awards and honors
 First Team All-NBL – Frank Brian
 Second Team All-NBL – Bill Closs and Boag Johnson

References

Anderson Packers seasons
Anderson
National Basketball League (United States) championship seasons
Chicago American Gears
Chicago American Gears